There are two species of lizard named Sulawesi sailfin lizard, both native to Indonesia:

 Hydrosaurus microlophus
 Hydrosaurus celebensis